Iraivikutty Pillai was the commander-in-chief of Venad Kingdom in the present Kerala, India

Overview
Iravikkutti Pillai belonged to Nair family of Keralapuram in Kalkulam, Travancore now in the Kanyakumari District of Tamil Nadu. His father was Keralapuram Raja. His mother was Umayamma. Kuzhikkottu Pappuvilakathu Kochu Narayanan  was his Guru in warfare.

He became a minister under the King Unni Kerala Varma of Venad. During his time, Madurai Thirumala Naickar attacked Venad. Pillai was asked to lead the Venad army and the attack which was spearheaded by Velayyan was repulsed. As a reward, Iravikkutti Pilla was appointed the Chief Minister and the Commander-in-Chief of Venad. But Thirumala Naickar sent another army under the leadership of Ramappayyan to attack Venad. The battle at Kaniyamkulam near Nagercoil was decisive. Some army commanders within Venad army were Tirumala naicker army disguised as Venad army attacked Pillai and eventually the Madurai army defeated the Venad army. Iravikkutti Pillai was killed in the battle. This incident became the theme for the folk song for the Villadichan Paattu ‘Kaniyakulathu Poru’ in the local Malayalam dialect. This song describes the life history of Iravikkutti Pillai and his trusted disciple Kunjirakottu Kaali Nair (Kaaliyan).

His cemetery was near Keralapuram Siva temple close to his ancestral house. There is also have Bhadra kali temple which is called as Padathalavan Bhadrakali Temple.  His reputed horse was also cremated near his cemetery opposite the temple.

References

 "Mahacharitha Samgraham" by Pallippattu Kunjukrishnan.
"Iravikuttipilla poru: Oru Padanam" by Doctor Thikkurisi Gangadharan

Indian military leaders
People from Kerala
Year of birth missing
Year of death missing